Victoricus may refer to:

 Victoricus of Amiens (died circa 287-303), martyr 
 Victoricus of Carthage (died 259), one of the Martyrs of Carthage under Valerian